The Phobos  program was an unmanned space mission consisting of two probes launched by the Soviet Union to study Mars and its moons Phobos and Deimos. Phobos 1 was launched on 7 July 1988, and Phobos 2 on 12 July 1988, each aboard a Proton-K rocket.

Phobos 1 suffered a terminal failure en route to Mars. Phobos 2 attained Mars orbit, but contact was lost before the final phase, prior to deployment of the planned Phobos landers. Phobos 1 and 2 were of a new spacecraft design, succeeding the 4MV type used in the Venera planetary missions of 1975–1985, and the 5VK design last used during the Vega 1 and Vega 2 missions to Comet Halley. They each had a mass of 2600 kg (6220 kg with orbital insertion hardware attached).

The program featured cooperation from 14 other nations, including Sweden, Switzerland, Austria, France, West Germany, and the United States (which contributed the use of its NASA Deep Space Network for tracking the twin spacecraft).

Objectives
The objectives of the Phobos missions were to:

 conduct studies of the interplanetary environment;
 perform observations of the Sun;
 characterize the plasma environment in the Martian vicinity;
 conduct surface and atmospheric studies of Mars; and,
 study the surface composition of the Martian satellite Phobos.

Spacecraft design
The main section of the spacecraft consisted of a pressurized toroidal electronics section, surrounding a modular cylindrical experiment section. Below these were mounted four spherical tanks (the Fregat stage) containing hydrazine for attitude control and, after the main propulsion module was to be jettisoned, orbit adjustment. A total of 28 thrusters (twenty-four 50 N thrusters and four 10 N thrusters) were mounted on the spherical tanks, with additional thrusters mounted on the spacecraft body and solar panels. Attitude was maintained through the use of a three-axis control system, with pointing maintained with Sun and star sensors.

Phobos 1

Phobos 1 operated nominally until, a few weeks into the cruise to Mars, an expected communications session on September 2, 1988, failed to occur. The failure of controllers to regain contact with the spacecraft was traced to an error in the software uploaded on August 29/August 30, which had deactivated the attitude thrusters. By losing its lock on the Sun, the spacecraft could no longer properly orient its solar arrays, thus depleting its batteries.

Software instructions to turn off the probe's attitude control, normally a fatal operation, were part of a routine used when testing the spacecraft on the ground.  Normally this routine would be removed before launch.  However, the software was coded in PROMs, and so removing the test code would have required removing and replacing the entire computer.  Because of time pressure from the impending launch, engineers decided to leave the command sequence in, though it should never be used.  However, a single-character error in constructing an upload sequence resulted in the command executing, with subsequent loss of the spacecraft.

Phobos 2

Phobos 2 was launched atop a Proton-K with a Blok D upper stage from Baikonur cosmodrome on July 12, 1988, and entered Mars orbit on January 29, 1989. Phobos 2 operated nominally throughout its cruise and Mars orbital insertion phases on January 29, 1989, gathering data on the Sun, the interplanetary medium, Mars, and Phobos. Phobos 2 investigated Mars's surface and atmosphere and returned 37 images of Phobos with a resolution of up to 40 meters. Communications were lost before planned deployment of a Phobos lander.

Systems and sensors
Phobos probes carried several instruments:  solar x-ray and ultraviolet telescopes, a neutron spectrometer and the Grunt radar experiment designed to study the surface relief of Phobos.
The lander had an x-ray/alpha spectrometer to provide information on the chemical element composition of the surface of Phobos, a seismometer to determine the internal structure of Phobos, and the "Razrez" penetrator with temperature sensors and an accelerometer for testing the physical and mechanical properties of the surface.

The Phobos 2 infrared spectrometer (ISM) obtained 45000 spectra in the near infrared (from 0.75 to 3.2 µm) in the equatorial areas of Mars, with a spatial resolution ranging from 7 to 25 km, and 400 spectra of Phobos at 700 m resolution. These observations made it possible to retrieve the first mineralogical maps of the planet and its satellite, and to study the atmosphere of Mars. ISM was developed at IAS and DESPA (Paris Observatory) with support from CNES.

List of instruments:
 "VSK" TV imaging system
 PROP-F "hopping" lander. Only carried by Phobos 2.
ARS-FP automatic X-ray fluorescence spectrometer
ferroprobe magnetometer
Kappameter magnetic permeability / susceptibility sensor
gravimeter
temperature sensors
BISIN conductometer / tiltmeter
mechanical sensors (penetrometer, UIU accelerometer, sensors on hopping mechanism)
"DAS" (long-lived autonomous station) lander
TV camera
ALPHA-X Alpha-Proton-X-Ray Spectrometer
LIBRATION sun sensor (also known as STENOPEE)
Seismometer
RAZREZ anchor penetrometer
Celestial mechanics experiment
 "ISM" thermal infrared spectrometer/radiometer - 1–2 km resolution
 near-infrared imaging spectrometer
 thermal imaging camera; magnetometers
 gamma-ray spectrometers
 X-ray telescope
 radiation detectors
 radar and laser altimeters
 Lima-D laser experiment - designed to vaporise material from the Phobos surface for chemical analysis by a mass spectrometer
 Automatic Space Plasma Experiment with Rotating Analyzer (ASPERA), an electron spectrometer and ion mass analyser from the Swedish Institute of Space Physics.
 "Grunt" imaging radar - Only carried by Phobos 1

See also
 Exploration of Mars
 List of missions to Mars
 Space exploration

References

 Articles in Nature 341 (1989) pages 581 - 619
Phobos Project Information (NASA NSSDC)
Fobos 1F
ISM - Phobos-2 archive
The Airport Terminal - also known as Mariner 9 #4209-75
The Complete Phobos 2 VSK Image Data Set

External links
 High quality processed images from the Phobos 2 mission
 Phobos mission images from the Space Research Institute (IKI)
 Raw image data from the Phobos 2 ISM infrared instrument
 What we are searching for on Phobos - an article on the Phobos program at the Web site of the Russian Space Agency 
 Another site with processed images from the Soviet Phobos 2 mission

Missions to Mars
1988 in the Soviet Union
1988 in spaceflight
Soviet Mars missions
Derelict space probes
Phobos (moon)
Non Earth orbiting satellites of the Soviet Union